Estádio Antônio Guimarães de Almeida is a stadium located in Tombos, Brazil. It is used mostly for football matches and hosts the home matches of Tombense. The stadium has a maximum capacity of 3,050 people.

References

External links
Almeidão on OGol
Almeidão on Federação Mineira de Futebol

Tombense Futebol Clube
Football venues in Minas Gerais
Tombos